Adantor Akakpo (born 21 September 1965) is a Togolese footballer. He played in two matches for the Togo national football team from 1992 to 1997. He was also named in Togo's squad for the 1998 African Cup of Nations tournament.

References

External links
 

1965 births
Living people
Togolese footballers
Togo international footballers
1998 African Cup of Nations players
Association football goalkeepers
21st-century Togolese people
OC Agaza players
People from Atakpamé